Záboj and Slavoj (Czech: Záboj a Slavoj) is an outdoor sculpture by Josef Václav Myslbek, installed at Vyšehradské sady in Vyšehrad, Prague, Czech Republic. It depicts the heroic brothers from the manuscripts of Dvůr Králové and of Zelená Hora. The brothers were leaders of the rebellion against invasion of the German troops of Charlemagne and allegedly led the victorious battle in 805.

References

External links

 

Outdoor sculptures in Prague
Sculptures of men in Prague
Statues in Prague